Malaysian Technical University Network (Formerly known as Technical University College Network of Malaysia) was introduced on Mac 2006. In February 2007, TUCN has changed to MTUN due to rebranding of four College University name to University.

List of institutions

See also
University System of Tunku Abdul Rahman

References

Professional associations based in Malaysia
Educational organisations based in Malaysia
Technical universities and colleges in Malaysia
Engineering universities and colleges in Malaysia
Organizations established in 2006
2006 establishments in Malaysia